Mariyam Unoosha (born 6 October 1985), known mononymously as Unoosha is a Maldivian female singer and songwriter. She is from a prominent Maldivian singing family. Her parents were in the 90s famous band " Olympians".  She has won many awards and has performed in various high caliber shows in Maldives and abroad.

Life and career

Early life 
Unoosha was born on 6 October 1985 in Malé and graduated from Aminiyya School. She started singing at a very young age. Her parents (Shafeega and Mr. Naseer) are music legends in Maldives. She won the 1st place of "The inter School Music Competition" in a row and became the first ever female vocalist to win the competition 3 times.

After a year since she finished her O’levels, she took up an offer from a local Music band called Amazon Jade and worked with the band for 4 years. Now with over 100 studio recordings to her name, many albums which release in Maldives have songs by Unoosha. Since then she has hosted a music show for kids for 2 seasons titled Lets Sing With Kiddy. She has also performed on Mariah Carey wedding renewal ceremony at Reethi Rah resort.

Bollywood career 
Unoosha made her bollywood debut with in the 2012 Pooja Bhatt-directed erotic thriller film Jism 2. She got the chance while she was in India at the South Asian Film Festival, which was held in Goa. Bhatt heard Unoosha sing at the festival and felt that there was something unique in her voice. Pooja then met the singer and offered her to sing for her film and Unoosha readily agreed. The song titled "Hey Walla" was composed by Abdul Basit Sayeed, and written by Unoosha herself along with Sayeed. 

Unoosha recorded her second Bollywood song along with Ali Azmat and KK, for the upcoming Jism franchise. The song titled "Kahaan Se Karen Shuru" is composed by Arko Pravo Mukherjee. This would be the first Bollywood song Unoosha records in Hindi where the previous had English lyrics.

Discography

Feature Film

Television

Non-Film Songs

Accolades 
Unoosha who is the only singer who has been an official ambassador of an international brand Nescafé and the local ambassador of Maldives leading telecom company Dhiraagu and the branded Eyewear company Eyecare.

References

External links 

 

1985 births
Living people
Bollywood playback singers
People from Malé
Maldivian singers